Demetri Catrakilis (born on 6 July 1989) is a former South African professional rugby union player for the  in the Pro14. His regular playing position is fly-half.

Early career

School

Catrakilis attended St John's College in Johannesburg where he played in the first team from the age of fifteen, and went on to captain the team in his final school year.

Golden Lions

Catrakilis represented the  Under-18 team in the 2007 Academy Week as their first-choice fly half. He was then chosen to represent the  team for the 2008 Under-19 Provincial Championship.

Racing Métro 92

Following Catrakilis' Under-19 Provincial Championship season with the Golden Lions, he then joined the youth team of French Top 14 side Racing Métro 92, where he enjoyed a brief stint with the Under-23 squad in 2009, before returning home to South Africa.

Varsity Cup

Catrakilis played for the  during the 2011 Varsity Cup after a season for Western Province Super League club False Bay. He was the highest point scorer of the tournament with 136 points in his debut Varsity Cup season, helping the Ikey Tigers to win their first Varsity Cup. They beat  26–16 in the final with Catrakilis picking up the Man of the Match award.

Professional career

2011 : Western Province

He marked his starting debut by scoring 22 points as Western Province won the match 47–9. He remained as the starting fly-half throughout the season of Western Province's Currie Cup season.

Catrakilis won the ABSA Currie Cup Player of the Month for August and also delivered a Man of the Match performance against the then-unbeaten and eventual champions  in a 28–26 win in Round Six of the competition with a 100% kicking success rate and a drop goal. He eventually scored a total of 150 points with the boot and helped Western Province reach the semi-finals. His performances saw him awarded the Western Province Club's Player of the Year.

2012 : Western Province

Catrakilis finished second on the top-point scorer's list with 127 points in the competition and also scoring the winning conversion in the final against the Griquas. In November 2012, he was awarded with the Vodacom Cup player of the year award for his successful campaign.

After the Vodacom Cup, Catrakilis was retained as the first-choice fly-half for Western Province for their 2012 Currie Cup Premier Division campaign. He had a starring role in the final against the Sharks at Kings Park, where he kicked three penalties and slotted two drop kicks – one with each foot – in the final quarter of the game, to help Western Province to win the match 25–18 to win their first Currie Cup title since 2001. He accumulated a total 136 points during the 2012 season.

2013 : Southern Kings

In August 2012, it was announced that he would join the  prior to the 2013 season on a two-year deal. Catrakilis scored four penalties in the Kings' historical 22–10 victory over the Force.

Catrakilis remained the first choice fly-half for the Kings for the duration of the 2013 Super Rugby season, making fourteen appearances in the competition and scoring 37 penalties, 14 conversions and a drop goal to finish with a tally of 142 points.

Catrakilis was largely responsible for helping the Kings to two away victories in their maiden season. A try from number eight Cornell du Preez three minutes into injury time pulled the score back to 28–26 to the Brumbies and Catrakilis converted the subsequent conversion to secure a 28–28 draw.

However, three minutes into injury time, Catrakilis scored a drop goal for the Kings to clinch the match 30–27 and secure their first ever victory on foreign soil in their first Super Rugby season.

This was the only time the Kings achieved a bonus point win during the 2013 season.

2013 : Return to Western Province

Despite being injured for the opening rounds of the 2013 Currie Cup Premier Division, he returned to Western Province squad for their match against . He played off the bench in the match against Griquas, as well as against the  the following week, where he scored a match-winning drop goal in a 29–27 victory.

2014 : Stormers

In 2014, Catrakilis was selected for in the  squad for the 2014 Super Rugby season. He made appearances in the remainder of the competition and, although a nose break ruled him out for a number of weeks, he finished the competition with 44 points.

2014 : Western Province

Catrakilis was handed the number 10 jersey at the start of the 2014 Currie Cup Premier Division competition and he helped  to victories in all ten matches that he started. Western Province finished the regular season of the competition at the top of the log, securing home advantage in both the semi-final and the final, with Catrakilis contributing a personal points tally of 39 points. Jaco Taute scored Western Province's only try of the match, with Catrakilis converting the try and kicking four penalties as Western Province won the match 19–16 to win the 2014 Currie Cup, their second Currie Cup title in three years. Catrakilis' performance was awarded with the ABSA Man of the Match award. He ended the campaign as the joint-top point scorer alongside the ' Jacques-Louis Potgieter with 123 points.

2015 : Stormers

The  built on 's Currie Cup success by finishing the 2015 Super Rugby season as South African Conference Winners. Catrakilis finished the season as the top South African points scorer with 170 points, converting 62 of his 71 attempts at goal to finish with an 87% success rate.

2015 : Western Province

Catrakilis started the first four of Western Province's matches in the 2015 Currie Cup Premier Division and made a further three appearances off the bench – scoring 53 points in his seven appearances – before being released by Western Province to take up a contract with Montpellier.

2015–2017 : Montpellier

In January 2015, Catrakilis signed a contract to join French Top 14 side  to link up with former South African World Cup winning head coach Jake White.

In Catrakilis's first season with Montpellier, he won the 2015–16 European Rugby Challenge Cup with a 26-19 victory over Harlequins. He also finished as the competition's Top Point scorer with a total of 79 points. Montpellier then went on to finish third in the Top 14 season, however they lost to Toulon in the semi finals with a score of 27-18.

The following season saw Montpellier finish in third place once again in the Top 14, however their season ended with a 13-22 loss to Racing 92 in the Quarter Finals of the competition.

2017 : Harlequins

Catrakilis made the move to England to join Premiership side Harlequins prior to the 2017–2018 season. He missed a large part of his first season at Harlequins after suffering a life threatening injury where he broke a bone in his throat. After a lengthy lay off, he made a full recovery and returned to the playing field.

2019–present : Return to Southern Kings

He signed a one-year loan deal for the 2019–20 season from the Harlequins, with an option to extend to a second season.

International career

On 22 May 2013, Catrakilis was selected for a Springboks training camp prior to a Quadrangular test series featuring Italy, Scotland and Samoa. Subsequently, Catrakilis was also included in a Springbok training camp leading up to the 2015 Rugby World Cup.

Honours and records

UCT Ikey Tigers

 2011 Varsity Cup: winner
 2011 Varsity Cup: Top points scorer
 2011 Varsity Cup Final: Man of the Match

Western Province

 2011 Currie Cup Premier Division: August Player of the Month
 2011: Western Province Club's Player of the Year.
 2012 Vodacom Cup: winner
 2012 Vodacom Cup: Player of the Year
 2012 Currie Cup Premier Division: winner
 2014 Currie Cup Premier Division: winner
 2014 Currie Cup Final: Man of the Match
 2014 Currie Cup: Joint top points scorer

Kings

After the 2013 Super Rugby season, Catrakilis held the following records for the franchise:

 Most points in a match: 15 (achieved twice – vs  and )
 Most conversions in a match: 4 (vs )
 Most penalties in a match: 5 (vs )
 Most drop goals in a match: 1 (vs )
 Most points in a season: 142
 Most conversions in a season: 14
 Most penalties in a season: 37
 Most drop goals in a season: 1

Stormers

 2015 Super Rugby season: Joint all-time record holder for most consecutive successful goal attempts – 28
 2015 Super Rugby season: South African Conference winners
 2015 Super Rugby: Top South African points scorer

Montpellier

 2015–16 European Rugby Challenge Cup : winner.
 2015–16 European Rugby Challenge Cup : Top Point Scorer.
 2016-17 Top 14 : Player of the week.
 2016-17 Top 14 : Team of the month.

Statistics

Soccer

Catrakilis was also a talented footballer at youth level; in 2005, he was selected for an Invitational South Africa team that played in the Brazil Cup. and he also spent 2007 with South African Premier Soccer League team Moroka Swallows before choosing to pursue a career in rugby union rather than football.

A video which became a hit with the rugby and football public was released by the Stormers which displayed Catrakilis mixing his Football and Rugby skills.

References

External links

It's Rugby profile

1989 births
Living people
Rugby union players from Johannesburg
South African rugby union players
Western Province (rugby union) players
Stormers players
University of Cape Town alumni
Rugby union fly-halves
South African people of Greek Cypriot descent
Alumni of St John's College (Johannesburg)
Montpellier Hérault Rugby players
Harlequin F.C. players
Southern Kings players
South African expatriate rugby union players
South African expatriate sportspeople in England
South African expatriate sportspeople in France
South African expatriate sportspeople in Israel
Expatriate rugby union players in England
Expatriate rugby union players in France
South African rugby union coaches